Kyle Hamilton (born February 26, 1978) is a Canadian rower from Richmond, British Columbia. He won the gold medal at the 2002, 2003 and 2007 world championships for Canada's men's eight team in Milan, Italy and Seville, Spain and Munich.

He won a gold medal at the 2008 Summer Olympics in the men's eights with Andrew Byrnes, Malcolm Howard, Adam Kreek, Kevin Light, Ben Rutledge, Dominic Seiterle, Jake Wetzel and cox Brian Price.

Kyle now works as a litigation lawyer with Cook Roberts LLP in Victoria, British Columbia.

References

External links
 Rowing Canada Bio's
 

1976 births
Living people
Olympic gold medalists for Canada
Olympic rowers of Canada
Rowers at the 2004 Summer Olympics
Rowers at the 2008 Summer Olympics
Rowers from Victoria, British Columbia
People from Richmond, British Columbia
Canadian male rowers
Olympic medalists in rowing
Medalists at the 2008 Summer Olympics
World Rowing Championships medalists for Canada
21st-century Canadian people